Javed Ahmad is a 1984 batch retired Indian Police Service (IPS) officer belonging Uttar Pradesh cadre.

Education 
Ahmed has graduate and postgraduate degrees in History (BA:History and MA:History) from St. Stephen's College.

Career
Javeed Ahmad has served in various key positions for both Uttar Pradesh Government (Police) and Union government, like as the Director General (DG) of Uttar Pradesh Police, Director General of Provincial Armed Constabulary, Director General of Uttar Pradesh Government Railway Police (GRP), Inspector General/Secretary in Department of Home and Confidential of Uttar Pradesh Government, Inspector General (IG) of Central Zone of Provincial Armed Constabulary (PAC), Deputy Inspector General (DIG) of Mirzapur range, and as the District Senior Superintendent of Police/Superintendent of Police of Jaunpur, Balia, Ghazipur and Pauri Garhwal districts in the Uttar Pradesh government, and as the Director of NICFS (in the rank of Director General), Joint Director of CBI (in the rank of Inspector General), Deputy Inspector General in CBI, Superintendent of Police in CBI in the Union government.

Decorations 

  President's Police Medal for Distinguished Service - Received on 15 August 2008
  Police Medal for Meritous Service - Received on 26 January 2000
  50th Independence Anniversary Medal - Received on 15 August 1997

See also
Law enforcement in India

References

Director Generals of Uttar Pradesh Police
Indian Police Service officers
St. Stephen's College, Delhi alumni
People from Patna
Living people
1960 births